Effium is the largest autonomous Igbo community in Ebonyi State of southeast region, Nigeria. Effium is located in the Ohaukwu local government area of Ebonyi State. The indigenous people are known as Uffiom and Ezza Effium, but the most spoken indigenous language is the Ezza language.

Economy 
The major occupation in Effium is agriculture. The major agricultural produce include: yam, cassava, rice, groundnut, palm oil and timbers

Demographics 
Effium community has other minor communities which includes: Inikiri Umuezeoka, Umuezeokaoha, and Kpakpaji communities.

History 
The first tribe that settled in Effium was Uffiom and Ezza Effium followed by Arochukwu, Amuda and others.

Culture 
Effium as a community has no common culture because it is inhabited by two different tribes with different cultures.

Effium shares common boundaries with Izzi, Ngbo, Uli and Igumale.

It has a very large market popularly known as Nwafia Effium market or Effium main market among many others where agricultural commodities are purchased in large quantities and transported to other parts of the country and for export. It is one of the largest markets in Ebonyi State, Nigeria. Other markets in Effium include Inikiri Bernard market and Nwekendiagu market,

References

Ebonyi
Populated places in Ebonyi State
Lists of villages in Nigeria
Ebonyi State